Daulton may refer to:
Daulton, California
Darren Daulton (1962–2017), American baseball player
Daulton Varsho (born 1996), American professional baseball player
Jack Daulton (born 1956)

See also
 Dalton (disambiguation)